Kersegan (also Romanized as Kersegān; also known as Karaskān) is a village in Abrisham Rural District, in the Central District of Falavarjan County, Isfahan Province, Iran. At the 2006 census, its population was 3,539, in 904 families.

References 

Populated places in Falavarjan County